James Robert Fletcher (23 December 1926 – March 2014) was an English footballer who played as a forward in the Football League for Chester. He was on the books of Birmingham City without making a first-team appearance, and played non-league football for clubs including Bilston and Wellington Town.

References

1926 births
2014 deaths
People from South Staffordshire District
English footballers
Association football forwards
Bilston Town F.C. players
Birmingham City F.C. players
Chester City F.C. players
Telford United F.C. players
English Football League players